Mycale laevis, the orange icing sponge or orange undercoat sponge, is a species of marine demosponge in the family Mycalidae. Mycale is a large genus and this species is placed in the subgenus Mycale making its full name, Mycale (Mycale) laevis. This sponge is found in the Caribbean Sea and the Gulf of Mexico and usually grows in association with one of a small number of species of coral.

Description
Mycale laevis is yellow, mid to dark orange or yellowish-green. They are elevated with a thick white or translucent collar. This sponge is easily torn and its consistency is compressible but firm.

Ecology
Mycale laevis usually grows on the undersurface of certain species of corals that form flat plates. These include Montastraea annularis, Montastraea cavernosa, Porites astreoides, Agaricia agaricites and Mycetophilia lamarckiana. The sponge seems able to cause the rim of the coral to fold and become lobed and inserts its oscules in the gaps between the lobes. Often the sponge is found covering the under side of an entire groups of colonial corals. It is unclear what is the precise relationship between the coral and the sponge but the latter may benefit from being held clear of the substrate while the coral may avoid having its undersurface mined by a parasitic boring sponge. Observation over several years has shown that this is a stable relationship. In the absence of suitable coral species, Mycale laevis is able to live directly on rocks and under boulders as an encrusting or massive sponge and also on calcareous worm tubes.

Distribution

References

Poecilosclerida
Sponges described in 1882